Cormier-Village is a Canadian rural community located in Westmorland County, New Brunswick.  It is administratively part of the Rural Community of Beaubassin East.

History

This community is the site of the Cormier-Village hayride accident, which occurred on October 8, 1989, and resulted in the deaths of 13 people and 45 people suffering injuries.

Notable people

See also
List of communities in New Brunswick
Cormier Aerodrome

References

Communities in Westmorland County, New Brunswick
Communities in Greater Shediac